Tatyana Vasilievna Solomatina (born 21 April 1956) is a Russian doctor, stateswoman and political figure. She represents the Ob constituency in the State Duma.

Political career 
A member of United Russia, Solomatina is the Deputy Chair of the State Duma Committee on Health Protection, Candidate of Medical Sciences.

In 2017, according to Forbes Woman magazine, she topped the rating of the ten richest female politicians in Russia. Her declared income for 2016 amounted to 56 million rubles.

Sanctions
In December 2022 the EU sanctioned Tatyana Solomatina in relation to the 2022 Russian invasion of Ukraine.

References 

Living people
1956 births
United Russia politicians
People from Tomsk Oblast
Seventh convocation members of the State Duma (Russian Federation)
Eighth convocation members of the State Duma (Russian Federation)
21st-century Russian women politicians
Russian women physicians